Pellicle may refer to:

Pellicle (biology), a thin layer supporting the cell membrane in various protozoa
Pellicle mirror, a thin plastic membrane which may be used as a beam splitter or protective cover in optical systems
Pellicle (dental), the thin layer of salivary glycoproteins deposited on the teeth of many species through normal biologic processes
Pellicle, the protective cover which can be applied to a photomask used in semiconductor device fabrication. The pellicle protects the photomask from damage and dirt
Pellicle, the growth on the surface of a liquid, also known as SCOBY
Pellicle (cooking), a skin or coating of proteins on the surface of meat, fish or poultry, which allow smoke to better adhere the surface of the meat during the smoking process. 
Pellicle (material), a brand name for a very resistant synthetic material used for covering different surfaces, such as that of the Aeron chair